Mateja is a given name, variant of the Greek given name Mathias (Matthew). In Serbian, it's a masculine name, while in Croatian and Slovene, it's a feminine name.

Notable people with the name include:

Given name
Mateja Andrlić (born 1993), Croatian football forward
Mateja Kežman (born 1979), Serbian footballer
Mateja Maslarević (born 2000), Serbian footballer
Mateja Matejić (1924–2018), Serbian Orthodox priest
Mateja Matevski (1929–2018), Macedonian poet, literary and theater critic, essayist, and translator
Mateja Nenadović (1777–1854), Serbian priest and politician
Mateja Petronijević (born 1986), Croatian sailor
Mateja Pintar (born 1985), Slovenian table tennis player
Mateja Robnik (born 1987), Slovenian alpine skier
Mateja Šimic (born 1980), Slovenian triathlete
Mateja Svet (born 1968), Slovenian alpine skier
Mateja Zver (born 1988), Slovenian footballer

Surname
Andrzej Mateja (1935–2019), Polish cross-country skier
Robert Mateja (born 1974), Polish ski jumper

See also
 
Matej
Matea
Matija
Matejić (surname)

Serbian masculine given names
Macedonian masculine given names
Croatian feminine given names
Slovene feminine given names